Lleision ap Thomas or Llyson Thomas etc. (died ) was the last abbot of Neath in West Glamorgan, Wales.
He was one of the most influential Cistercians in Wales in the period before the Dissolution of the Monasteries.
He is widely rumoured to have settled as a farmer in the upper Swansea valley, raising a family who remain in the locality of the name Leyshon

Abbot of Neath
Lleision ap Thomas succeeded John ap Hywel (Hoell), who is mentioned as Abbot of Neath in 1507.
Lleision is mentioned as abbot on 28 January 1510.
He studied at the University of Oxford and obtained the degrees of B.Can.L. in 1511 and B.D. in 1512.
In 1513 Lleision was appointed to a commission of the peace that met at Cardiff.
He was named Reformator of the Cistercian Order for Wales, and was noted for his zealous activity.
In 1517 he was named a definitor for the family of Clairvaux, and in 1518 became a definitor for the lineage of Cîteaux.
He visited Paris in 1521 in connection with work for the Order.

In 1532 King Henry VIII of England appointed Lleision to replace the Abbott of Chaâlis as one of five abbots on a visitation of England and Wales.
In 1532 he was said to hold the leading position in public life of Gower, and played a major role in handling disputes between the English and Welsh portions of this district.
He was also charged that year with restoring the college of Saint Bernard in Oxford.
Llyson, Abbot of Nethe, Lewis, Abbot of Morgo, and others were named in a commission of the peace on 24 February 1536.

Later life
Neath abbey had an income of only £132 annually at the time of the Dissolution of the Monasteries and therefore should have been covered by the Act of Suppression in 1536, which applied to the lesser monasteries.
The abbey obtained a stay of this decision in exchange for payment of a fine of £150.
However, on 9 February 1539 Lleision had to resign and to cede all the possessions of the abbey to the king.
In response to an appeal to Thomas Cromwell by the Crown deputy, Sir John Prise, he was given a rectory and a pension of £48.
His rectory of Llangatwg-iuxta-Nedd (Llangattock-juxta-Neath) was situated beside his former monastery.
There are no records of Lleision after 1541.

Lleision ap Thomas was the most influential of the late medieval Cistercian abbots in Wales.
According to Lewys Morgannwg he was pious and learned, and Neath Abbey was a bastion of the Welsh language and culture.
In 1539 one of the Crown Visitors said "He had ever lived worshipfully and well."

Notes

Sources

1541 deaths
Cistercian abbots
Welsh Cistercians
Neath